Shahriaz is a Bangladeshi actor and model. He acted in Pagla Diwana in (2015) opposite Pori Moni and in Nagar Mastan in (2015) with Pori Moni. And he also acted in Gundami (2016) and Aaral (2016) with actress Achol and Shooter (2016) and Meyeti Ekhon Kothay Jabe (2017) and Crime Road (2017) and Chol Palai (2017) and Fifty Fifty Love (2018) and Bou Bazar (2019) and Protishodher Agun (2019).

Early life
Shahriz started his education life in Khulna. After finishing study in college, he went to the United Kingdom. He achieved CA degree from Oxford. Later he came back to Bangladesh.

Film career 
After coming back to Bangladesh he worked in a TV drama named Megher Kheya in 2011. He also worked in TV dramas such as Amader Songsar, Beder Meye Josna and Reaction. Besides, he worked as a ramp model.

He made his film debut in 2014 with Ki Darun Dekhte. In 2015 his 4 films were released. The films were Putro Ekhon Poysawala, Murder 2,
Pagla Diwana and Nagar Mastan. In 2016 his 3 films were released. The films were Gundami, Aral and Shooter.

In 2017 he worked in 3 films as main male character. The films were Meyeti Ekhon Kothay Jabe, Crime Road and Chol Palai. Meyeti Ekhon Kothay Jabe won National Film Award in four categories. Besides, in that year he had guest appearance on Rajneeti which was released on Eid-Ul-Fitr. His film Fifty Fifty Love was released in 2018. In 2019 his films Bou Bazar and Protishodher Agun were released.

Filmography

References

External links 

 

Living people
People from Khulna District
Male actors in Bengali cinema
Bangladeshi male models
Bangladeshi male television actors
Bangladeshi male film actors
Bengali television actors
Year of birth missing (living people)